Mount Pangulubao or Pangulubau is a mountain near Lake Toba in Sumatra.

Mount Pangulubao is notable for its large number of native tropical pitcher plant species. These include Nepenthes ampullaria, Nepenthes gymnamphora, Nepenthes mikei, Nepenthes ovata, Nepenthes rhombicaulis, Nepenthes spectabilis, and Nepenthes tobaica. The natural hybrid Nepenthes × pangulubauensis is named after it.

See also

 Geography of Indonesia

References

Mountains of Sumatra
Landforms of North Sumatra